Shamoon Sultan is the Founder & CEO of Khaadi, one of Pakistan’s most successful and respected fashion retail companies. Since founding Khaadi in 1998, Shamoon has overseen a fast-growing portfolio that includes Khaadi and Chapter 2. He has won numerous industry awards including Lux Style Award for High Street Band thrice, Achievement in Fashion Design – Prèt award. He has also been nominated for various categories at Lux Style Awards.

Early life and education 
Shamoon was born to a Muslim family and earned his undergraduate degree in Textile Design from Indus Valley School of Art and Architecture. He specialized in Handloom and the process of weaving.

Career

Khaadi
In 1997, Shamoon’s visit to India strengthened his passion for reviving the craft of handloom in Pakistan. He said, "I went to India a couple of times where I saw a lot of craft being promoted through retail. There was absolutely nothing of the sort in Pakistan so I thought let's give it a try. I didn’t know how it was going to happen, but I just had faith in the product and what I was doing."

In December 1997 he opened his first shop in Karachi's Zamzama and received wide spread acclaim within two weeks. He told Dawn News  "We started getting feedback from day one. We were stocked out in two weeks and we had to shut down the store."By 2002, the brand was making women’s ready to wear and soon expanded into women’s luxury wear with Khaadi Khaas in 2008. In 2012, Khaadi changed to a fast fashion retail brand, evolving with customers and introducing colourful Khaadi Fabrics. With the launch of Khaadi Kids and Khaadi Home in 2012-2013, Khaadi Accessories in 2016 and Khaadi Fragrances in 2019, Khaadi became a lifestyle brand.

In 2010, Khaadi expanded internationally by opening stores in the UAE first in Dubai and later in Abu Dhabi. In 2013, after the global success of the brand, stores were planned in the UK.

In December 2021, a massive 32,000-square-foot store called ‘The Experience Hub’ opened in Karachi’s Dolmen Mall, marking the beginning of the brand’s reinvention.  

In addition to his role as CEO of Khaadi, Shamoon’s industry expertise have led him to serve on the Government of Pakistan’s Advisory Committees on Heritage and the Expo 20/20.

Sustainability 
In 2022, Shamoon Sultan founded Kreate Your Mark, a non-profit platform that aims to accelerate economic empowerment for women entrepreneurs in Pakistan.

Women entrepreneurs will receive 100% of the sales contribution from their product line and free access to dedicated spaces at the heart of the Experience Hubs and Centers in Karachi, Lahore and Islamabad.

Personal life 
Shamoon Sultan is married to Saira Ruth Shamoon, whom he met at Indus Valley School of Art and Architecture. She joined Khaadi in 2002 and is now the Chief Creative Officer, leading the creative department.

References

Khaadi
Pakistani fashion designers
Pakistani businesspeople in fashion
Pakistani costume designers
Muhajir people
Living people
Indus Valley School of Art and Architecture alumni
People from Karachi
Lux Style Award winners
Year of birth missing (living people)